Van der Hulst is a Dutch surname. Notable people with the surname include:

Abraham van der Hulst (1619-1666), Dutch admiral
Pieter Teyler van der Hulst (1702-1778), Dutch Mennonite merchant
Pieter van der Hulst (I) (1570-1627/8), Flemish painter
Pieter van der Hulst (II) (fl 1623-1637), Flemish painter
Pieter van der Hulst (III) (?-1648), Flemish painter
Pieter van der Hulst (IV) (1651-1727), Dutch painter
Jan Baptist van der Hulst (1790-1862), Flemish painter

See also
Van de Hulst (disambiguation)

Dutch-language surnames